The 1901 Victorian Football Association season was the 25th season of the Australian rules football competition. The premiership was won by the Port Melbourne Football Club; it was the second premiership in the club's history.

Ladder 
The premiership was decided on the basis of the best record across sixteen rostered matches, with each club playing the others twice; in the event of a tie for first place, a playoff match would have been held to determine the premiership.

Richmond led the ladder for most of the season, but a couple of losses in the latter part of the season meant that Richmond and Port Melbourne were level with records of 12–3 entering the final week of matches. On the final Saturday, Port Melbourne 7.12 (54) defeated Prahran 3.5 (23), and Richmond 2.2 (14) was defeated by North Melbourne 4.8 (32), resulting in Port Melbourne winning the premiership without the need for a playoff.

Notable events 
 Mr James Hall, president of the Williamstown Football Club, was elected president in April 1901; he served in the role until 1903. Hall replaced previous president Cr Theodore Fink, MLA.

External links 
 Victorian Football Association/Victorian Football League History (1877-2008)
 List of VFA/VFL Premiers (1877-2007)

References 

Victorian Football League seasons
VFL